Kadaikodu is a village near Edakkidom in Kollam district in the Indian state of Kerala, located about  north of Kollam city. The main attractions are the Kadaikodu Mahadeva Temple, Public Library Kadaikodu Navodaya Arts and Sports club and Yuvadhara Arts and Sports Club.

Schools 
Govt LPS KADAIKODU Estd.1928.
SNGSHS ( Sree Narayana Guru Sanskrit High School)
KNS Central School Kadaikodu  (Sree Narayana Trust)

Educational Institutions 
Universal Study Center Kadaikodu

Library 
Public Library Kadaikodu (Library building was inaugurated by famous cine artist Bharath Murali on 30 August 1998)

Studio 
Parvaty Digital Studio And Video

Distance from nearest known places 
 Kottarakara : 10 km
 Ezhukone : 5 km
 Kundara : 12 km
 Kannanalloor : 16 km
 Chathannoor : 13 km
 Odanavattom : 5 km
 Edakkidom ഇടയ്ക്കിടം : 2 km

References 

Villages in Kollam district